Peter Burke is an Irish former footballer. After serving in the Irish Army, Burke joined newly formed Derry City F.C. On 22 August 1929, he scored the club's first ever goal in the Irish League, in front of a crowd of 7,500 people against Glentoran at Derry City's home ground, Brandywell Stadium.

References

Association footballers from Northern Ireland
Derry City F.C. players
Possibly living people
Year of birth missing
Irish Army soldiers

Association footballers not categorized by position